The 1998–99 Bundesliga was the 36th season of the Bundesliga, Germany's premier football league. It began on 14 August 1998 and ended on 29 May 1999. 1. FC Kaiserslautern were the defending champions.

Competition modus
Every team played two games against each other team, one at home and one away. Teams received three points for a win and one point for a draw. If two or more teams were tied on points, places were determined by goal difference and, if still tied, by goals scored. The team with the most points were crowned champions while the three teams with the fewest points were relegated to 2. Bundesliga.

Team changes to 1997–98
Karlsruher SC, 1. FC Köln and Arminia Bielefeld were relegated to the 2. Bundesliga after finishing in the last three places. They were replaced by Eintracht Frankfurt, SC Freiburg and 1. FC Nürnberg.

Season overview
While Bayern Munich clearly dominated the league and secured the championship in round 31, the season is well remembered for the struggle against relegation which remained close until the final whistle. In the last round (round 34), five teams needed a win to remain in the top flight, with one team having to join Mönchengladbach and Bochum who already had lost their chances. At halftime, Frankfurt looked like the relegated team, but they turned a 0–0 draw into a 5–1 win against Kaiserslautern. Rostock (3–2 at Bochum) and Stuttgart (1–0 against Bremen) also won their matches, and the other two teams, Nürnberg and Freiburg, faced each other. Nürnberg lost 1–2 and was eventually overtaken by the other four teams, dropping from position 12 to 16, and had to go down to 2. Bundesliga.

With around twenty minutes to go, league table position #16 changed hands several times:

 68th minute: While Frankfurt had scored shortly after the break, Kaiserslautern equalized (1–1), therefore Frankfurt even more looked like the third relegated team.
 70th to 74th minute: Frankfurt scored (2–1), which still would not have been enough, but Rostock (1–0 up) conceded two goals at Bochum and was now in 16th place.
 77th to 82nd minute: Rostock equalized (2–2), but Frankfurt scored two more goals (4–1), leaving Rostock at #16 and now having the same goal difference as Nürnberg.
 83rd minute: Rostock scored another goal (3–2), which meant that Nürnberg (still 0–2 down) dropped to 16th place and would have been relegated.
 85th minute: Nürnberg scored (1–2) and climbed back up the table, leaving Frankfurt in the relegation zone again.
 89th minute: With the penultimate goal of the season (the final one being scored for Schalke at Munich), Frankfurt scored for the final time during the match which resulted in a 5–1 win over Kaiserslautern. Soon afterwards the games in Nürnberg (1–2), Frankfurt and Bochum (a 3–2 win for Rostock) ended, and Nürnberg were relegated.

In a famous post-match interview, Frankfurt's striker Jan Åge Fjørtoft, who had scored the team's decisive goal, praised Frankfurt's manager Jörg Berger claiming that he would have also saved .

Team overview

League table

Results

Top goalscorers

Champion squad

See also
 1998–99 2. Bundesliga
 1998–99 DFB-Pokal

References

External links
 DFB Bundesliga archive 1998/1999

Bundesliga seasons
1
Germany